Carlos Wilcox was a state senator in Louisiana. A Republican, he was a Unionist. He co-founded the Feliciana Savings and Exchange Bank. He was white and.had moved to Louisiana during or shortly after the Civil War.

References

Republican Party Louisiana state senators
19th-century American politicians